Gouyen (in Mescalero Góyą́ń, "the one who is wise") (c. 1857-1903), was a 19th-century Apache woman noted for her heroism.

Early life and education
Góyą́ń (Gouyen) was born circa 1857 into Chief Victorio's Warm Springs Apache or Chihenne band of Chiricahua Apache. She married as a young woman.

Vendetta against the Comanche
Gouyen's first husband was killed in a Comanche raid in the 1870s.  She took heroic actions to avenge his death, which have become legendary in Apache oral history. She tracked to his camp the Comanche chief who scalped her husband. There she found the chief watching a victory dance around a bonfire, and he was wearing her husband's scalp from his belt.

Gouyen donned a buckskin puberty ceremony dress and slipped into the circle of dancers.  She seduced the drunken chief to go with her to a secluded spot. After a struggle, she stabbed the Comanche to death with his own knife, scalped him, and took his beaded breechcloth and moccasins. Stealing a horse, Gouyen rode back to her camp.  She presented her in-laws with the Comanche leader's scalp and clothing as evidence of her triumphant revenge.

Battle of Tres Castillos 
Gouyen was a member of Victorio's band during their final days evading U.S. and Mexican troops along the U.S.-Mexican border.  On October 14, 1880, the group was resting at Tres Castillos, Mexico when they were surrounded and attacked by Mexican soldiers.  Victorio and 77 other Apache were killed, and several taken prisoner. Only 17 Apache escaped, including Gouyen and her young son Kaywaykla. Her infant daughter was said to have been killed in the attack.

Later life 
Gouyen married a second time, to an Apache warrior named Kaytennae.  He also escaped during the Battle of Tres Castillos. Afterward, Kaytennae was a member of Nana and Geronimo's band during the early 1880s. He and Gouyen escaped with Geronimo from the San Carlos Reservation in 1883.

During their maneuvers to evade capture, Gouyen saved Kaytennae's life by killing a man who was trying to ambush him. In 1886, Gouyen and her family were taken prisoner by the U.S. Army, along with others in Geronimo's band. They were held as prisoners of war at Fort Sill, Oklahoma, where she died in 1903.

References

External links
 Eve Ball, "The Vengeance of Gouyen",   Southwestern Crossroads
Jay W. Sharp, "Profile of an Apache Woman", Desert USA

Native American women in warfare
Female Native American leaders
Mescalero Apache people
1850s births
1903 deaths

Women in 19th-century warfare
19th-century Native American women
19th-century Native Americans
20th-century Native American women
20th-century Native Americans